The National Taiwan Normal University Football Team (NTNU FC) is a university football team participating in the Taiwan University League's Third Division. Founded in 2002 by Lai Wu-Xian and He Jun-Yi, the team only participates at the university level.

Honors
Bloom Cup: Runner-up in 2012, 2013, 2014.
UFA-Third Division: 2007: 8th; 2011: 6th

UFA record

UFA-Futsal record

Squad

Current squad

Successive presidents, captains and coaches

Successive team presidents

Successive team captains

Successive team coaches

References

 (Traditional Chinese)news video
 (Traditional Chinese)players
 (Traditional Chinese)historical ranking
 (Traditional Chinese)history data

External links
 NTNU FC Fans Page
 NTNU FC Official Site
List of Brazil international footballers
List of Brazil international footballers
http://edwardbetts.com/find_link/Peter_Zeidler
Kupferberg
https://www.reddit.com/r/sales/comments/a82856/new_to_roofing_sales_sales_ingeneral/
 National Taiwan Normal University
https://godaddydave.com

National Taiwan Normal University
Sport in Taipei